The Roman Catholic Diocese of Kakamega is a diocese located in the city of Kakamega in the Ecclesiastical province of Kisumu in Kenya.

History
 February 27, 1978: Established as Diocese of Kakamega from the Diocese of Kisumu

Bishops
 Bishops of Kakamega (Roman rite)
 Bishop Philip Sulumeti (February 27, 1978 -December 5, 2014 )
 Bishop Joseph Obanyi Sagwe (since December 5, 2014)

Other priest of this diocese who became bishop
Maurice Muhatia Makumba, appointed Bishop of Nakuru in 2009

See also
Roman Catholicism in Kenya
Diocese of Kakamega

References

Sources
 GCatholic.org
 Catholic Hierarchy

Kakamega
Roman Catholic dioceses in Kenya
Christian organizations established in 1978
Roman Catholic dioceses and prelatures established in the 20th century
Roman Catholic Ecclesiastical Province of Kisumu